Bray is a village in Kagisano-Molopo Local Municipality in the North West province of South Africa. It is situated on the border with Botswana opposite a village of the same name in that country.

References

Populated places in the Kagisano-Molopo Local Municipality